Welch Village is an American ski area near Red Wing, Minnesota. It was built by Leigh and Clem Nelson in 1965 and has grown considerably since then. Its traditional opening time is around the third Saturday in November. It allows both skiing and snowboarding. It is located near the Cannon River Valley. The area has slopes for beginners, intermediate and expert skiers or snowboarders.

Welch Village has a large chalet with two cafeteria-style restaurants. An adult chalet, Madd_Jaxx, serves alcohol near the triple lift on the east side of the resort. Welch Village offers ski instruction. Welch Village is not a resort.

It hosts the Welch Village Invitational, one of the US' largest High School Alpine Ski Meets.

Welch Village has nine chairlifts: four quad lifts, four double chairs and one triple chair. The area is lit for night skiing, with the exception of the terrain served by the triple chair and newer runs on the back side of the ski hill.

In recent years, Welch has undergone a significant expansion, doubling its snow-making capacity and opening a new experts-only area served by a quad chairlift installed in the fall of 2008.

References

 Hudson WI Patch article on St. Croix Valley ski history

External links

Buildings and structures in Goodhue County, Minnesota
Ski areas and resorts in Minnesota
Tourist attractions in Goodhue County, Minnesota
Red Wing, Minnesota